Francis or Frank Foster may refer to:

Music
 Frank Foster (jazz musician) (1928–2011), American jazz saxophonist
 Frank Foster (country singer) (born 1982), American country singer-songwriter active since 2011

Politics
 Frank Foster (Michigan politician) (born 1986), member of the Michigan House of Representatives in 2011–2014
 Frank Foster (Australian politician) (1872–1948)
 Francis Foster (Tasmanian politician) (1888–1979)

Sports
 Francis Foster (cricketer, born 1761) (1761–1847), English cricketer
 Francis Foster (cricketer, born 1848) (1848–1931), English cricketer
 Frank Foster (cricketer) (1889–1958), English cricketer
 Frank Foster (rugby league) (1940–2019), English rugby player and coach

Others
 Frank Hugh Foster (1851–1935), American clergyman of the Congregational church
 Frank Keyes Foster (1854–1909), American labor leader
 Frank William Foster (1887–1963), British Royal Air Force officer
 Frank Foster (Coronation Street), fictional character
 Frankie Foster, character in Foster's Home for Imaginary Friends

See also 
 Frances Foster (1924–1997), American actress
 Francis M. Forster, physician and neurologist
 Foster (surname)